The 2013–14 Regional Four Day Competition was the 48th edition of the Regional Four Day Competition, the domestic first-class cricket competition for the countries of the West Indies Cricket Board(WICB). The competition started on 28 February 2014 and Final finished on 29 April 2014.

Points Table 

Source: https://www.espncricinfo.com/series/regional-four-day-competition-2013-14-721717/points-table-standings

2013 in West Indian cricket
2014 in West Indian cricket
Regional Four Day Competition seasons